The Odd Fellows Building in Red Bluff, California was built during 1882–83.  It was the fourth home of the I.O.O.F. Lodge #76, one of the oldest Odd Fellows groups in Northern California.

It is a two-story  by red brick building with Italianate style designed by architect A. A. Cook of Sacramento.

It was listed on the National Register of Historic Places in 1976.

A.A. Cook also designed the NRHP-listed Cone and Kimball Building at 747 Main St. in Red Bluff and the 
NRHP-listed Pleasants Ranch at 8212 Pleasants Valley Rd. in Vacaville, California and the NRHP-listed Wheatland Masonic Temple, at 400 Front St. in Wheatland, California.

See also
 Odd Fellows Hall (Eureka, California): Another lodge in northern California
 National Register of Historic Places listings in Tehama County, California

References

External links
Photo, at Panoramio

Red Bluff, California
Red Bluff
Buildings and structures in Tehama County, California
Buildings and structures completed in 1883
Clubhouses on the National Register of Historic Places in California
History of Tehama County, California
Victorian architecture in California
Italianate architecture in California
National Register of Historic Places in Tehama County, California